The following is a list of NCAA institutions on probation, organized by division. Probation decisions are made by the National Collegiate Athletic Association's Committee on Infractions.

Division I FBS institutions on probation

The following Division I Football Bowl Subdivision institutions are currently on probation by the NCAA in one or more sports:

One of these institutions will serve a probation period in a second sport once its ongoing probation period expires.

Division I FCS institutions on probation

The following Division I FCS institutions are currently on probation by the NCAA in one or more sports:

One of these institutions will serve a probation period in a second sport once its ongoing probation period expires.

Division I non-football institutions on probation

The following Division I non-football institutions are currently on probation by the NCAA in one or more sports:

Division II institutions on probation

The following Division II institutions are currently on probation by the NCAA in one or more sports:

Division III institutions on probation

The following Division III institutions are currently on probation by the NCAA in one or more sports:

See also
 Death penalty (NCAA)

References

Probation